Khan Jahan Ali Bridge is a bridge over Rupsa River in Khulna, Bangladesh and named after Khan Jahan Ali. The bridge is also known as Rupsa bridge.

History 
In 2004, workers working at the construction site were harassed by Purba Banglar Communist Party who were trying to extort the firms involved in the construction of the bridge.

Location
The bridge is located 4.80 km far from Khulna Town. It is called the gateway of Khulna because this bridge connects the Southern districts of Bangladesh with Mongla, the second largest sea port of Bangladesh. The length of the bridge is 1.6 km and its width is 16.48 meters.

See also
 Rupsha Rail Bridge

References

Road bridges in Bangladesh
Bridges over the Rupsha